The 1995–96 Algerian League Cup is the 2nd season of the Algerian League Cup. The competition is open to all 26 Algerian clubs participating in the Algerian Ligue Professionnelle 1 only.

Group stage

Centre Region

Group A

Group B

West Region

Group C

East Region

Group D

Knockout stage

Semi-finals

Final

Notes & references

External links
  du Groupement Professional Algeria - List of Cup Finals - rsssf.com

Algerian League Cup
Algerian League Cup
Algerian League Cup